Arkansas State University Newport is a public two-year college system located in northeast Arkansas, with its flagship campus in Newport, Arkansas. The ASU-Newport system is a subset of the Arkansas State University System.

Campuses

Arkansas State University - Newport (Newport, AR)
Arkansas State University - Newport at Marked Tree (Marked Tree, AR)
Arkansas State University - Newport at Jonesboro (Jonesboro, AR)

History

The campus known as ASU-Newport today, was originally established in 1976 as White River Vocational-Technical School.  In 1991, the state legislature merged White River Vocational-Technical School with Arkansas State University - Beebe; the former became known as ASU-Newport. As of 2001, ASU-Newport was approved as a stand-alone campus, and reports directly to the ASU System, its Board of Trustees, and the President.

The institution operates under the policies of the Board of Trustees and the President of the Arkansas State University System, but programs at the campuses of ASU-Newport function separately under the leadership of a chancellor.

Delta Technical Institute at Marked Tree and Jonesboro merged with Arkansas State University and became ASU-Technical Center in 2001; later placed under ASU-Newport in 2008.

Accreditation

ASU-Newport is accredited by the Higher Learning Commission of the North Central Association of Colleges and Schools.

Athletics
On January 26, 2023, ASU-Newport announced that it will start athletic programs, beginning with men’s basketball and women’s softball, in the fall of 2023. They will be known as the Aviators and will compete in The NJCAA.

References

External links
 ASU-Newport official site
 ASU System official site

Buildings and structures in Jackson County, Arkansas
Educational institutions established in 1976
Newport
Education in Jackson County, Arkansas
1976 establishments in Arkansas
Public universities and colleges in Arkansas
Newport, Arkansas
Jonesboro, Arkansas